The Bugatti Type 55 is a sports car produced by Bugatti from 1932 to 1935. It is a road-going version of the Type 51 Grand Prix car. A roadster, it had a 108.3 in (2750 mm) wheelbase and 1800 lb (816 kg) weight.

History 
The Type 55 was introduced at the 1931 Paris Motor Show and that particular car, chassis 55201, was subsequently purchased by the Duke of Tremoille. It was available starting in 1932 and was produced until 1935, with the last car being delivered on July 30th of that year. 38 cars were produced in total. The majority of Type 55s had factory bodywork designed by Jean Bugatti, with 16 of the 38 wearing 2-seater roadster bodies and another 7 wearing coupe bodies, both of his design. Of the other 15, 11 were bodied by outside coachbuilders and the other four are unidentified. None of the factory bodied cars had doors which made them far less practical than the cars bodied by external coachbuilders, most of which did have doors. The Type 55 was often criticized by reviewers for its lack of practicality and for being deafening to ride in, due to a combination of noisy mechanicals and straight cut gears.

Specifications 
The Type 55 is powered by a detuned version of the Type 51's 2.3 L (2262 cc/138 in³) 2-valve DOHC straight-8 engine with a Roots-type supercharger. It produces 130 hp (96 kW) at 5000 rpm. Differences from the Type 51's engine include the addition of a camshaft driven AC mechanical petrol pump and a modified supercharger drive. The compression ratio was also lowered by the use of a larger 9 mm (0.3 in) compression plate (the Type 51 used a 6 mm (0.2 in) plate). The car's 4-speed manual transmission came from the Type 49 touring car and featured straight cut gears. The car also wore the signature Bugatti eight spoke aluminum wheels.

References 
55
24 Hours of Le Mans race cars
1930s cars
Cars introduced in 1931